Jon A. Levisohn is an American academic who is the Jack, Joseph and Morton Mandel Associate Professor of Jewish Educational Thought at Brandeis University. Levisohn is also the director of the Jack, Joseph and Morton Mandel Center for Studies in Jewish Education at Brandeis.

Education 
 Maimonides School, GED
 Harvard University, BA
 Stanford University, MA
 Stanford University, PhD

Bibliography

Books 
 Fendrick, Susan, and Jon Levisohn, eds. Turn it and Turn it Again: Studies in the Teaching and Learning of Classical Jewish Texts (Jewish Identities in Post-Modern Society). Academic Studies Press. .

References 

Living people
Brandeis University faculty
Harvard University alumni
Stanford University alumni
Judaic scholars
Date of birth missing (living people)
Place of birth missing (living people)
Year of birth missing (living people)